Forensic metrology is a branch of metrology (the science of measurements) applied to forensic sciences. Forensic laboratories and criminalistic laboratories perform numerous measurements and tests to support criminal prosecution and civil legal actions. Examples of forensic metrology include the measurement of alcohol content in blood using breathalyzers, quantification of controlled substances (both net weights and purity), and length measurements of firearm barrels. The results of forensic measurements are used to determine if a person is charged with a crime or may be used to determine a statutory sentencing enhancement.  Other examples of forensic metrology includes tests that measure if there is a presence of a substance (e.g., cocaine), latent print examination, questioned documents examination, and DNA analysis.

Forensic measurements are all supported by reference standards which are traceable to the International System of Units (SI) maintained by the International Bureau of Weights and Measures, to natural constants, or to reference materials such as those provided by the United States' national metrology institute known as the National Institute of Standards and Technology in Gaithersburg, Maryland.

Examples of instruments and equipment used in forensic metrology include breathalyzers, weighing balances & scales, rulers, calipers, gas chromotographs, and centrifuges.

Recent attention has been given to forensic metrology and metrological traceability as a result of an international effort to accredit forensic laboratories and criminalistic laboratories to the International Organization for Standardization 17025 requirements.

References

External links
 

Metrology